Natural Elements was the second major label release by Acoustic Alchemy from 1988. The shortest of all of the band's albums, only comprising eight tracks, Natural Elements set out to show what the title suggests: the organic side to Acoustic Alchemy's music.

Points to note from this album include the title track, Natural Elements, which became the theme tune to long-running BBC gardening show, Gardener's World, and the re-recording of an early track, "Casino", now re-arranged to include piano and full percussion parts. The track "Ballad For Kay" is dedicated to Nick Webb's wife, Kay.

Critical reception

Stewart Mason of AllMusic begins his review with, "Not quite complex enough to be jazz, not quite mellow or ambient enough to be new age, and just a little too cerebral to just be pop music, Acoustic Alchemy's Natural Elements is its own little oddity."

While doing an article on Acoustic Alchemy, Dirk Sutro of The Los Angeles Times wrote, "Americans love the rich acoustic music of Acoustic Alchemy. The British band has sold more than 100,000 copies each of its albums "Red Dust & Spanish Lace" and "Natural Elements" in the United States."

Track listing

Musicians

Nick Webb – guitars (steel and nylon)
Greg Carmichael – guitars (nylon)
Mike Herting – keyboards, synthesizers
Rainer Brüninghaus – acoustic piano, synthesizers
Mario Argandoña – percussion
Konrad Mathieu – bass
Bert Smaak – drums
Serge Maillard – programming
John Parsons – programming
Vera Elfert – recorder

Production

John Parsons – Producer
Milan Bogdan – Digital Editing
Klaus Genuit – Engineer
Günther Kasper – Engineer
Ashley Jackson – Painting (Front Cover)
Paul Cox – Photography (Back Cover)
Simon Levy – Art Direction
Benny Quinn – Mastering
Linda Schwab – Artwork
Virginia Team – Design
Manfred Struck – Mixing

Track information and credits adapted from the album's liner notes.

References

Acoustic Alchemy albums
1988 albums
GRP Records albums
MCA Records albums